Vincent Anstett (born 26 July 1982) is a French sabre fencer.

Anstett's greatest accomplishment is winning the gold medal in the sabre team event at the 2006 World Fencing Championships after beating Ukraine in the final. He accomplished this with his teammates Nicolas Lopez, Julien Pillet and Boris Sanson.

At the 2008 Summer Olympics, Anstett was a substitute for the same teammates that Anstett won the 2006 World Fencing Championships with, Nicolas Lopez, Julien Pillet and Boris Sanson, defeating the US in the final.

Achievements
 2006 World Fencing Championships, team sabre
 2007 World Fencing Championships, team sabre
Substitute for France's men's sabre team at the 2008 Beijing Olympics

References

1982 births
French male sabre fencers
Living people
Sportspeople from Strasbourg
Fencers at the 2016 Summer Olympics
Olympic fencers of France
Mediterranean Games silver medalists for France
Mediterranean Games medalists in fencing
Competitors at the 2013 Mediterranean Games
World Fencing Championships medalists
21st-century French people